The Matrix Reloaded: Limited Edition (2-CD Set) is a score album to the 2003 film The Matrix Reloaded. It was officially released on August 27, 2013. Unlike the  first soundtrack, which featured songs from the film, this release includes almost the entire film's score on two discs. Owing to licensing issues, the soundtrack does not include the film versions of two cues, Free Flight and Double Trouble.

Prior to the La-La Land release, a bootleg version had surfaced containing much the same material as the official release. However, despite being billed as the complete score, that album did not include a number of cues from the film, such as the extended version of the track "The Bane Transformation" and the cue directly after it, "The Bane Voyage".

Track listing

Composed, orchestrated and conducted by Don Davis. Performed by The Hollywood Studio Symphony.

Critical reception
Though reviews of this soundtrack have been relatively scarce in comparison to the first one, the overall reaction to the release has been positive. Positive reviews have come from websites Discogs (4 out of 5 stars) and Soundtrack DB (4 out of 5 stars), as well as favorable review from the blog 5:4.

This soundtrack has been noted for including tracks that do not appear in the movie. Davis's tracks "Burly Brawl (Alternate)" and "Chateau Swashbuckling (Alternate)" were unused in favor of alternate versions by Juno Reactor and Rob Dougan, respectively, with the latter portion of the unused "Burly Brawl" is heavily modified in the film to become the latter portion of the final film version of "Burly Brawl". Additionally, Davis's version of "Double Trouble" was altered in the film with the addition of samples from the song "Dread Rock" by Oakenfold, which is found on the first Matrix Reloaded soundtrack.

See also
 Simulated Reality

References

The Matrix (franchise) albums
2013 soundtrack albums
2010s film soundtrack albums
La-La Land Records soundtracks
Film scores
Don Davis (composer) soundtracks